Oleksiy Kuznetsov (born 28 May 1991 in Makiivka, Donetsk Oblast, Ukraine) is the winner of the first season (2009–2010) of the Ukrainian X Factor. He competed in the Under 25 category and was mentored by judge Yolka. He won ₴2 million in cash prizes, as well as a musical contract with Sony Music Russia, a division of Sony Music Entertainment.

His name is alternatively translated Olexiy, Alexey, Alexei and last name Kuznecov. He studied music at the Donetsk Musical College, an academic school of singing, specializing in vocals. He also worked in the Donetsk National Academic Theater of Opera and Ballet. He is also an avid sportsman and boxer.

References

External links
Page on Ukrainian X Factor site

The X Factor winners
People from Makiivka
1991 births
Living people
21st-century Ukrainian male  singers